Gualtiero Zanolini of Italy is a former member of the World Scout Committee, the main executive body of the World Organization of the Scout Movement.

Background
Until 2011, Zanolini was a member of the World Scout Committee representing Italy.

After many years of effort by Zanolini, the Interreligious Scout Forum, which coordinates religious denominations in consultative status with WOSM, held the first World Scout Interreligious Symposium in Valencia, Spain, from 29 November to 2 December 2003 through support from members of the Movimiento Scout Católico.

Zanolini is a price statistician at the Italian National Institute of Statistics, and has presented before the International Working Group on Price Indices.

See also

 Associazione Guide e Scouts Cattolici Italiani
 International Catholic Conference of Scouting

References

External links
 DESMOS is Preparing for Participation at the 23rd World Scout Jamboree in Japan

World Scout Committee members
Living people
Year of birth missing (living people)
Scouting and Guiding in Italy